The Children's Monologues was a theatrical performance, produced by Amber Sainsbury at Old Vic Theatre in London on 14 November 2010 and at Royal Court Theatre on 25 October 2015 for the benefit of Dramatic Need. It featured the adapted stories of children's first-hand experiences in South Africa being retold and re-interpreted by and performed by actors such as Catherine Zeta-Jones, Sir Ben Kingsley, Benedict Cumberbatch, Tom Hiddleston, Kit Harington, Gemma Arterton and Eddie Redmayne, directed by Danny Boyle.

Synopsis
The play was performed on 7 February, in the lead-up to World Aids Day 2010, with 15 actors, 7 writers and director Danny Boyle participating. The play was dedicated to the work of Dramatic Need and intended to raise money for the Pete Patsa Arts Centre. Writers adapted 12 monologues from personal tales handwritten by children living in abysmal conditions in rural South Africa. These monologues were performed on stage by the actors at the Old Vic Theatre in London.

The stories
The Children's Monologues soliloquise the testimonies and re-lived memories of young people, some still small children. Some struggled with horrible realities of death and violence, while others shared cherished moments of rare and short-lived happiness. The monologues ranged from light hearted tales of birthday parties and the joy of birthday oranges, to a redemptive tale of a gangster-gone-good to absolutely harrowing, brutally raw stories of rape and violation.

Cast

Nikki Amuka-Bird, a woman infected with AIDS finding out she's pregnant and struggling with the decision between keeping it or not.
Nonso Anozie
Gemma Arterton
Catherine Zeta-Jones
Rose Byrne
Charlie Cox, told of a young boy hugely excited to be taking part in a math contest.
Benedict Cumberbatch, a missionary worker helping a young boy who had been caught stealing.
Kerry Fox
Olivia Grant
Tom Hiddleston, played Prudence, a young girl upset with her mother for her father leaving and excited for the birthday orange she'll receive as oranges taste like joy, only to have it eaten by an elephant while on her birthday trip at the zoo.
Jenny Jules
Ben Kingsley, retold the tale of a young girl who was gang raped on Christmas Eve.
Hattie Morahan
Wunmi Mosaku, told the tale of a young girl whose excitable birthday preparations are interrupted by the arrival of 4 squatters who beat and rape her.
Lucian Msamati, played the over protective father providing his daughter with his many pearls of wisdom on her first day of school.
Eddie Redmayne, played a young boy positively ecstatic at the prospect of turning 7 and all the wonders his birthday party will bring.

Music
The music for the event was arranged by Paul Gladstone-Reid. He incorporated original recordings of the children reading their stories in Sesotho and Tswana into the score. A youth choir also performed on the night.

References

External links

2010 plays
HIV/AIDS in theatre
Melodramas
Plays set in Africa
Plays based on real people
Plays based on actual events